Bong Jung-keun (or  ; born July 15, 1980) is a South Korean former professional baseball player. He played in Major League Baseball with the Atlanta Braves and Cincinnati Reds, and in the KBO League with the LG Twins. He batted and threw left-handed.

Career

Amateur
Bong is often considered one of the greatest hitting pitchers in Korean high school baseball history. While attending Shinil High School in Seoul, he was a highly regarded five-tool player and control pitcher in the Korean High School baseball league, playing as the team's 3rd batter and No.1 starter.

In September , as a freshman at Shinil High School, Bong was named the Best Pitcher in the 50th Golden Lion Flag National High School Baseball Championship, taking 4 of the team's 5 wins. As the team's leadoff hitter, he batted .353 with 6 hits in 17 at-bats.

In May , Bong led his team to its national title at the 52nd Blue Dragon Flag National High School Baseball Championship, going 11-for-16 with 9 RBIs as a batter and racking up 3 wins as a starting pitcher. He won batting (.688), RBI and wins titles, and was unanimously named the tournament MVP.

In September , Bong helped his team to capture another national title at the 51st Golden Lion Flag National High School Baseball Championship. He was named Best Pitcher, earning 4 out of the team's 5 wins as a utility pitcher. As a batter, Bong finished runner-up in batting (.571, 8-for-14) and won the stolen bases title.

International
In August , Bong competed for the South Korea national junior baseball team in the World Junior Baseball Championship held in Moncton, Canada. In the round robin phase, he went 15-for-25 with 11 RBIs and 13 runs, and hit home runs in 4 consecutive games, playing in 5 preliminary games as a center fielder and relief pitcher. South Korea was eliminated by USA 7–0 in the quarterfinals, but Bong additionally accumulated 3 hits and 3 RBIs in the 5th–8th classification games. He finished the tournament with a .500 batting average (18-for-36), 14 RBIs and 4 home runs, and was named the tournament MVP. He also won the home run title and was selected to the All-Star team as an outfielder as well.

Bong also helped Korea to the gold medal at the 2008 Olympics in Beijing.

Bong also appeared in the 2009 World Baseball Classic against Japan as a starter, allowing 3 hits and scoring 2 strikeouts in 5 innings for a 1–0 victory.

Notable international careers

Major League Baseball career
Bong began his career with the Braves, signing with the team in 1998 while still in High school for a bonus of $1.7 million. Bong made his major league debut in  pitching 6 innings in one game. The next year, he was moved to the bullpen and pitched in 44 games, winning six and losing two, and recorded his first save. He missed the whole  season due to shoulder surgery, and the Reds outrighted him to Triple-A Louisville after the season.

KBO League career
The Reds released him on May 12, 2006; he returned to Korea to continue his career.

In , with the LG Twins, Bong had a 2.66 ERA and 140 strikeouts.

Bong retired from professional baseball on September 19, 2018, after 12 years playing for the LG Twins.

Personal records

Filmography

Television shows

References

External links 
 
Career statistics and player information from Korea Baseball Organization

Bong Jung-keun Fancafe at Daum 

1980 births
Living people
Atlanta Braves players
Cincinnati Reds players
Major League Baseball players from South Korea
South Korean expatriate baseball players in the United States
Major League Baseball pitchers
Gulf Coast Braves players
Macon Braves players
Myrtle Beach Pelicans players
Greenville Braves players
Richmond Braves players
Louisville Bats players
Chattanooga Lookouts players
LG Twins players
Olympic baseball players of South Korea
Baseball players at the 2008 Summer Olympics
Olympic gold medalists for South Korea
2006 World Baseball Classic players
2009 World Baseball Classic players
Olympic medalists in baseball
Medalists at the 2008 Summer Olympics
Asian Games medalists in baseball
Baseball players at the 2010 Asian Games
Baseball players at the 2014 Asian Games
Asian Games gold medalists for South Korea
Medalists at the 2010 Asian Games
Medalists at the 2014 Asian Games